Ossetra (also Oscietra, Osetra, or Asetra) caviar is one of the most prized and expensive types of caviar (eclipsed in price only by Beluga caviar). It is obtained from the Ossetra sturgeon, which weighs 50-400 pounds and can live up to 50 years. 

Ossetra caviar varies in color from deep brown to gold. Lighter varieties are more sought after, as they have the richest flavor and come from the oldest sturgeon. Golden Ossetra is a rare form of Ossetra caviar and is golden-yellow with a very rich flavor.

The word Ossetra is the transcription of the genitive case form "осетра" (osetra, "of sturgeon") of the Russian word "осётр" (osyotr "sturgeon") from the phrase икра осетра (ikra osetra, "caviar of sturgeon"). At one time, "ossetra" referred to Russian sturgeon species harvested for this type of caviar.

Source animals
In Russian, there are different names for the species of sturgeon that live in various territories, such as Beluga (Huso huso), Sevruga (Acipenser stellatus) and Sterlet (Acipenser ruthenus). The name Ossetra corresponds to the species Acipenser gueldenstaedtii, which is much smaller than Beluga sturgeon (Huso huso), and has a firmer texture. In the territory of the Russian Federation dwells another type of sturgeon, Siberian sturgeon (Acipenser Baerii), which is farmed all over the world because it can adapt to a wider range of habitats. It begins to produce caviar faster than Acipenser gueldenstaedtii.

Production
Today, the Ossetra-bearing species faces extinction in its native Caspian habitat because wild-caught Russian sturgeon (acipenser gueldenstaedtii) are immediately slaughtered to determine their sex and egg-bearing condition. Farm-raised sturgeon are periodically scanned by harmless ultrasound to make the same determination. Continuous drastic declines in natural sturgeon populations over the past 30 years, plus a high market demand for caviar, have led the way for the cultivation of sturgeon for caviar production.

As with all other caviar, ossetra is traditionally served on blinis with crème fraiche, chopped hard-boiled egg whites, and chopped onions. Lower-grade varieties of caviar are used as stuffing in many seafood and meat dishes. Caviar is often added to salads as well.

References

External links
World Sturgeon Conservation Society
Osetra Caviar

Roe
Iranian cuisine
Russian cuisine